Fernand L. Delmotte (24 July 1920 – 4 July 1998) was a Belgian veteran of the Battle of Belgium and a politician from the Socialist Party who was a Senator, Minister and Member of the European Parliament for the French-speaking electoral college from 1979 to 1984.

See also 

 List of members of the European Parliament for Belgium, 1979–1984

References 

1920 births
1998 deaths
MEPs for Belgium 1979–1984

Members of the Senate (Belgium)
20th-century Belgian politicians
Government ministers of Belgium
Socialist Party (Belgium) politicians
Socialist Party (Belgium) MEPs
Walloon movement activists
Belgian military personnel of World War II